Chozi is a town in the Nakonde District of Muchinga Province in Zambia.

Location

The geographical coordinates of Chozi, Zambia are
9°19'33.0"S, 32°40'53.0"E (Latitude:-9.325833; Longitude:32.681389).

Overview
Politically it belongs to the  Nakonde constituency. The Mwenzo Mission is based here. There is a river of the same name, the Chozi River, and the Chozi Floodplain where crops are grown.

Economic activity
Chozi is connected by Chozi railway station. Copper, lead and zinc are transported through here. In 1978 some 4,907 tonnes of copper and 548 tonnes of lead and zinc were left at Chozi for an entire month during transportation.

Transport
Chozi marks the north-eastern end of the Nseluka–Kayambi–Chozi Road, that connects Mungwi District to the south-west and Nakonde District to the north-east. It was improved to class II bitumen surface, with culverts and drainage channels, during the late 2010s.

Population
According to the 2010 national population census Chozi had 7,131 people, with 3,503 males (49.1 percent) and 3,628 females (50.9 percent).

Health
Chozi is served by Chozi Rural Health Centre, a health facility under the administration of the  Zambian Ministry of Health.

References

Populated places in Muchinga Province